Alberto Belén (born 22 June 1917, date of death unknown) was an Argentine footballer. He played in eight matches for the Argentina national football team from 1940 to 1943. He was also part of Argentina's squad for the 1941 South American Championship.

References

External links
 

1917 births
Year of death missing
Argentine footballers
Argentina international footballers
Place of birth missing
Association football midfielders
Newell's Old Boys footballers
Club de Gimnasia y Esgrima La Plata footballers
Club Atlético Platense footballers
Club Atlético Colón footballers